The 2008–09 Cornell Big Red men's basketball team represented Cornell University in the 2008–09 college basketball season. This was coach Steve Donahue's 8th season at Cornell. The Big Red compete in the Ivy League and played their home games at Newman Arena. They went 11–3 in Ivy League play to win the championship and received the league's automatic bid to the 2009 NCAA Division I men's basketball tournament. They received a 14 seed in the West region. They were beaten by No. 3 seed Missouri in the first round to finish their season at 21–10.

Roster

Source

Schedule and results
Source
All times are Eastern

|-
!colspan=9 style=| Non-conference regular season

|-
!colspan=9 style=| Ivy League Regular Season

|-
!colspan=10 style=| NCAA tournament

References

Cornell
Cornell Big Red men's basketball seasons
Cornell
Cornell
Cornell